Arcade is a city in Jackson County, Georgia, United States. As of the 2020 census it had a population of 1,884.

History
Arcade was chartered in 1909. Early plans to erect an arcade-style schoolhouse accounts for the name.

Geography
Arcade is located in southern Jackson County at  (34.076951, -83.551147). It is bordered to the north by Jefferson, the county seat.

U.S. Route 129 passes through the southern side of the city, leading northwest  to Interstate 85 in the northern outskirts of Jefferson, and southeast  to Athens. Georgia State Route 82 leads south from Arcade  to Winder.

Arcade does not have its own ZIP code, but instead uses neighboring Jefferson's code of 30549.

Demographics

As of the census of 2000, there were 1,643 people, 565 households, and 457 families residing in the city. The racial makeup of the city was 88.37% White, 7.18% African American, 0.06% Native American, 2.31% Asian, 0.67% from other races, and 1.40% from two or more races. Hispanic or Latino of any race were 1.70% of the population.

There were 565 households, out of which 42.7% had children under the age of 18 living with them, 62.5% were married couples living together, 11.7% had a female householder with no husband present, and 19.1% were non-families. 15.6% of all households were made up of individuals, and 1.9% had someone living alone who was 65 years of age or older.  The average household size was 2.91 and the average family size was 3.19.

In the city, the population was spread out, with 29.8% under the age of 18, 8.8% from 18 to 24, 35.5% from 25 to 44, 20.8% from 45 to 64, and 5.1% who were 65 years of age or older.  The median age was 33 years. For every 100 females, there were 102.6 males.  For every 100 females age 18 and over, there were 104.4 males.

The median income for a household in the city was $37,604, and the median income for a family was $37,750. Males had a median income of $31,914 versus $21,602 for females. The per capita income for the city was $15,159.  About 11.9% of families and 12.4% of the population were below the poverty line, including 14.8% of those under age 18 and 12.5% of those age 65 or over.

References

External links
City of Arcade official website
Athens Banner-Herald: As town dries out, it grows

Cities in Georgia (U.S. state)
Cities in Jackson County, Georgia